The  2018 NAPB season was the inaugural season for the North American Premier Basketball.  For 2018, the league consists of eight teams: the Albany Patroons, Kansas City Tornados, Kentucky Thoroughbreds, Nevada Desert Dogs, Ohio Cardinals, Rochester Razorsharks, Vancouver Knights, and Yakima SunKings.

The Ohio Cardinals were replaced after 23 games by the Ohio Bootleggers, a semi-professional team in the North American Basketball League that also apparently had taken over operations of the Vancouver Knights sometime during the season. The Knights also had become a travel team at that point and was transferred to a new ownership group that was never identified.

The season ended with the SunKings defeating the Patroons two-games-to-none in the best-of-three finals to win the inaugural NAPB championship.

Standings
Final standings:

Season award winners

Source:

Playoffs
There were eight teams in the league with the top four teams seeded one to four for the playoffs. Each round of the playoffs were played a best-of-three series.

Draft
The inaugural player draft for the league was held on December 3, 2017, and the league's eight charter teams took turns selecting players who had all competed at the college level in the United States at some point.

Vance Cooksey of Youngstown State University was the first overall NAPB selection taken by Vancouver Knights. Consequently, this makes him the first-ever selection in the history of the league. 

Although some of the players chosen in the draft had played semi-professional or professional basketball after college graduation, only the United States colleges they attended are listed.

References

External links
Official website

The Basketball League seasons
TBL Draft